James Harder (November 19, 1931 – January 9, 2009) was an American actor.

Born to Titanic survivor George Achilles Harder and Elizabeth Peebles Rhodes, he was a graduate of Buckley School, St. Mark's School, and Princeton University.

He appeared in over 130 stage productions, as well as small roles in films like The Telephone Book, Paternity, and Author! Author!, and TV series like Spin City and Ed. He also appeared in commercials, most notably playing Big Fig in 1970s Fig Newton commercials, and appearing in several of CTW's "Betcha Don't Know" PSAs in the 1980s.

He died of natural causes on January 9, 2009. He is survived by his wife Dorothy and his daughter.

References

External links

Fig Newton clip on YouTube

1931 births
2009 deaths
American male stage actors
American male film actors
American male television actors
Princeton University alumni
20th-century American male actors
Buckley School (New York City) alumni
St. Mark's School (Massachusetts) alumni